The United States Court for the Middle District of Louisiana (in case citations, M.D. La.) comprises the parishes of Ascension, East Baton Rouge, East Feliciana, Iberville, Livingston, Pointe Coupee, St. Helena, West Baton Rouge, and West Feliciana. Court is held at the Russell B. Long United States Courthouse in Baton Rouge, Louisiana. It falls under the jurisdiction of the United States Court of Appeals for the Fifth Circuit (except for patent claims and claims against the U.S. government under the Tucker Act, which are appealed to the Federal Circuit).

The United States Attorney's Office for the Middle District of Louisiana represents the United States in civil and criminal litigation in the court.  the United States Attorney is Ronald C. Gathe.

History
On March 26, 1804, Congress organized the Territory of Orleans and created the United States District Court for the District of Orleans - the only time Congress provided a territory with a district court equal in its authority and jurisdiction to those of the states. The United States District Court for the District of Louisiana was established on April 8, 1812, by 2 Stat. 701, several weeks before Louisiana was formally admitted as a state of the union. The District was thereafter subdivided and reformed several times. It was first subdivided into Eastern and Western Districts on March 3, 1823, by 3 Stat. 774.

On February 13, 1845, Louisiana was reorganized into a single District with one judgeship, by 5 Stat. 722, but was again divided into Eastern and the Western Districts on March 3, 1849, by 9 Stat. 401. Congress again abolished the Western District of Louisiana and reorganized Louisiana as a single judicial district on July 27, 1866, by 14 Stat. 300. On March 3, 1881, by 21 Stat. 507, Louisiana was for a third time divided into Eastern and the Western Districts, with one judgeship authorized for each. The Middle District was formed from portions of those two Districts on December 18, 1971, by 85 Stat. 741, making it one of the youngest districts in the United States.

Current judges 
:

Former judges

Chief judges

Succession of seats

See also 
 Courts of Louisiana
 List of current United States district judges
 List of United States federal courthouses in Louisiana
 United States District Court for the Eastern District of Louisiana
 United States District Court for the Western District of Louisiana
 United States Court of Appeals for the Fifth Circuit

References

External links
 United States District Court - Louisiana Middle District

Louisiana, Middle District
Louisiana law
Baton Rouge, Louisiana
1971 establishments in Louisiana
Courthouses in Louisiana
Courts and tribunals established in 1971